Pleasantdale is a census-designated place (CDP) in West Orange Township, Essex County, New Jersey, United States. It is in the northwest part of the township, bordered to the north by Eagle Rock Avenue, to the east by Pleasant Valley Way, to the south by Interstate 280, and to the west by Livingston Township and the borough of Roseland. The boundaries of the CDP may differ from local understanding of the community's extent. Crestmont Country Club atop Second Watchung Mountain occupies the western side of the CDP.

Pleasantdale was first listed as a CDP prior to the 2020 census.

Demographics

References 

Census-designated places in Essex County, New Jersey
Census-designated places in New Jersey
West Orange, New Jersey